Notre-Dame de Paris is a sung-through French musical which debuted on 16 September 1998 in Paris. It is based upon the novel Notre-Dame de Paris (known in English as The Hunchback of Notre-Dame) by the French novelist Victor Hugo. The music was composed by Riccardo Cocciante (also known as Richard Cocciante) and the lyrics are by Luc Plamondon.

Since its debut, it has been professionally played in Belgium, Canada, China, France, Italy, Japan, Lebanon, Luxembourg, Poland, Russia, Singapore, South Korea, Spain, Switzerland, Taiwan, Turkey, United Kingdom and United States, and has been translated into eight languages (English, Spanish, Italian, Russian, Korean, Flemish, Polish, and Kazakh). A shorter version in English was performed in 2000 in Las Vegas, Nevada (United States) and a full-length London production, also in English, ran for seventeen months. Several songs from the show, such as "Vivre", "Belle" and "Le temps des cathédrales", have been released as singles with a huge success in French speaking countries. As of 2022, two original stars, Daniel Lavoie and Bruno Pelletier played Gringoire and Frollo in Canada. 

Notre-Dame de Paris, according to the Guinness Book of Records, had the most successful first year of any musical ever. The score has been recorded at least seven times to date (2007): the original French concept album, which featured Israeli singer Achinoam Nini (aka Noa) as Esmeralda was followed by a live, complete recording of the original Paris cast. A complete recording of the score in Italian was made, along with a single disc of highlights in Spanish from the Barcelona production. The original London cast album featured several of the original Paris stars, but only preserved a fraction of the score in English.

Synopsis

Act I
The story is set in Paris in the year 1482. The poet Gringoire, who throughout the story acts not only as a participant but also as a sort of commentator, enters to set the scene for the story; he relates how Man has written his history in the building of the cathedrals ("Le temps des cathédrales").

The homeless and refugees, led by Clopin, swarm before the entrance to the Cathedral of Notre Dame begging for help and sanctuary ("Les sans-papiers"). Frollo, the Archdeacon of Notre Dame, orders Phoebus, the Captain of the Royal Archers, to have his men disperse the crowd ("Intervention de Frollo"). As his men are driving off the refugees, Phoebus catches sight of the beautiful Romani girl Esmeralda (in later productions, the scene changes to have him see her while she is dancing before Notre Dame) and is entranced by her. Esmeralda tells him about herself, her life as a Traveller, and her dreams ("Bohémienne"). Instead of arresting her, Phoebus leaves her alone.

Clopin, who has watched over Esmeralda since she was eight years old after the death of her parents, tells her that she is no longer a child and that she has reached the age where she will discover love ("Esmeralda tu sais"). He warns her to be extremely careful, since not all men are to be trusted.

In the next number, the audience is introduced to the nobly-born and beautiful Fleur-de-Lys, to whom Phoebus is engaged to be married. Fleur-de-Lys's love for Phoebus is childish and irrational, like that of Juliet for Romeo ("Ces diamants-là").

Now begins the wild and coloured Feast of Fools, presided over by Gringoire ("La fête des fous"), the climax of which is the choosing of the King of Fools from among the group of people who can make the ugliest face; the King will be crowned by Esmeralda. Hiding in the shadows is a monstrous figure who is dragged out into the light; it is the bell-ringer of Notre Dame, the hunchbacked and facially deformed Quasimodo. By unanimous decision, Quasimodo is chosen and crowned as the King of Fools, but he knows that for all the power he has this one day nothing can make a woman such as Esmeralda care for him ("Le pape des fous").

Frollo breaks up the festivities and orders Quasimodo to kidnap Esmeralda and bring her to him that night so that she can be imprisoned as a sorceress and a violator of public decency ("La sorcière"). Quasimodo, who is devoted to Frollo for raising and educating him after he had been abandoned as a baby ("L'enfant trouvé"), says he will obey.

Night falls on Paris with its dark and hidden secrets commented on by Gringoire ("Les portes de paris"). Quasimodo stalks Esmeralda through the dark streets and is about to seize her when Phoebus and his guards arrive and arrest Quasimodo. Phoebus introduces himself to Esmeralda. He makes a date for a rendezvous with her the next night at the Cabaret du Val d'Amour. Phoebus and his men take Quasimodo away and Esmeralda darts off into the darkness ("Tentative d'enlèvement").

At the Court of the Miracles, the haven for all of the outcasts of Paris, Clopin presides over a wild revel, remarking that all are truly equal here no matter their race, religion, skin color or criminal background ("La cour des miracles"). Gringoire, who has wandered in accidentally, is seized and Clopin tells him that he will be hanged for his trespassing – unless one of the women will agree to marry him. Esmeralda who has arrived during this, agrees to marry Gringoire (in name only) and Clopin, as King of the Outcasts, unites them and they join in the wild revelry.

Later, when Gringoire and Esmeralda are left alone ("Le mot Phoebus") he introduces himself to her as "the Prince of the Streets of Paris" and assures her that while he is not a "ladies' man" ("un homme a femmes"), he would be glad if she would be his Muse and inspiration. Since Gringoire is educated, Esmeralda asks him what the word "Phoebus" means; he tells her that in Latin it means "the sun" or "sun god". Esmeralda muses on the word as it romantically relates to the man Phoebus ("Beau comme le soleil"); she is joined on stage by Fleur-de-Lys, who also muses on Phoebus (although she seems to be more apprehensive about him), but both believe that Phoebus will love them forever.

Phoebus himself is under no apprehensions about what kind of man he is – he wants both women, one as a wife and one as a temporary mistress ("Déchiré").

The next day, Frollo summons Gringoire to Notre Dame and questions him about Esmeralda, forbidding him to touch her. Gringoire changes the conversation by asking about a strange inscription in Greek on the wall of the Gallerie des Rois in Notre Dame, the word "Ananké". Frollo tells him that "Ananké" means "Fate" in Greek. They watch as Quasimodo is dragged on stage bound on The Great Wheel as sentence for his attempted kidnapping of Esmeralda ("Anarkia").

Quasimodo endures his punishment, but cries out for water ("A boire"), a plea that is ignored by everyone. Suddenly Esmeralda appears and gives him a drink of water from her cup, an act of kindness that deeply touches the poor hunchback. He is then released from the Wheel, and he, Frollo and Phoebus sing about their different feelings for Esmeralda ("Belle"): Quasimodo about his growing feelings of tenderness for her, Frollo about his growing fascination for her, and Phoebus (watched jealously by Fleur-de-Lys) about his wish for an affair with her before he marries Fleur-de-Lys.

Quasimodo leads Esmeralda into Notre Dame and tells her how the cathedral has been his home and sanctuary, and now it can be hers whenever she needs one ("Ma maison c'est ta maison"). In spite of her initial fear of this strange, deformed man, Esmeralda is touched by his gentleness and finds herself warming towards Quasimodo. Left alone, Esmeralda, who has never prayed before, prays to the Virgin Mary ("Ave Maria païen"), while Quasimodo thinks of her ("Si tu pouvais voir en moi"). Frollo, secretly spying on Esmeralda, realizes that his lust for her will destroy him, but knows that he cannot resist nor does he want to ("Tu vas me détruire").

That night, Phoebus is on his way to the Cabaret du Val d’Amour for his rendezvous with Esmeralda when he realizes he is being stalked by a shadowy figure. The figure (Frollo in disguise) warns him to go no further ("L'ombre"), but Phoebus refuses to heed the threat and continues on his way.

At Val d’Amour, Gringoire (who seems to be a regular customer) remarks how everyone, no matter the race, creed or color, comes here for a good time of one kind or another ... for a very low price ("Le Val d’Amour"). Phoebus arrives (he seems to be a regular customer here too) and meets Esmeralda in a private room ("La volupté"). They embrace and are about to make love when Frollo rushes in and stabs Phoebus with Esmeralda's knife (which she had placed on the floor earlier). Esmeralda collapses over Phoebus’ body, Frollo makes his escape and Gringoire, Clopin, Frollo, Quasimodo and the Chorus comment on the terrible power of Fate ("Fatalité").

Act II
Frollo and Gringoire discuss the events and scientific discoveries taking place and how some of them (such as Johannes Gutenberg’s printing press and Martin Luther’s doctrines) are changing the world forever ("Florence"). Gringoire notices how silent the cathedral is and Frollo tells him that Quasimodo has not rung the bells for three days.

Up in the bell tower, Quasimodo recounts how the cathedral bells are his only friends and loves ("Les cloches"), especially the three "Maries": "Little Marie" which is rung for children's funerals, "Big Marie" which is rung when ships set sail and "Great Marie" which is rung for weddings. His greatest hope is that they will ring for Esméralda to hear that he loves her.

Frollo asks Gringoire where his "wife" is ("Ou est Elle?"); Gringoire says he does not know and answers obliquely (but he tells Clopin, who has been searching for Esmeralda, that she has been imprisoned in the prison of La Sainte and that she will be hanged if Clopin doesn't save her).

In her cell, Esmeralda compares herself to a caged bird and calls to Quasimodo to save her, while back at Notre Dame Quasimodo wonders about Esmeralda's disappearance three days earlier and fears for her safety ("Les oiseaux qu'on met en cage"). Clopin and a group of outcasts are arrested and thrown into the La Sainte prison ("Condamnes") as Esmeralda is put on trial for the attempted murder of Phoebus and sorcery with Frollo as presiding judge ("Le procès" / "La torture"); when she refuses to confess, she is subjected to a foot-crushing torture until she cries out "I confess!" Frollo sentences her to death by hanging, but Esmeralda still professes her love for Phoebus and Frollo is left to suffer from the emotional torment of his unrequited passion ("Être prêtre et aimer une femme"). Esmeralda calls Phoebus to save her (“Phoebus”)

Elsewhere, a recovered Phoebus is confronted by Fleur-de-Lys, but he claims as an excuse that he was bewitched by Esmeralda's "sorcery" ("Je reviens vers toi"). Fleur-de-Lys tells him that he will still have her heart and love if he will swear to have Esmeralda executed ("La monture").

At five o'clock in the morning of the execution, Frollo visits Esméralda's cell and to her horror confesses to her that he knifed Phoebus out of love for her ("Visite de Frollo a Esmeralda" / "Un matin tu dansais") and offers her a choice: death on the gallows or life by giving him love. When Esmeralda rejects his advances, he tries to rape her, but Quasimodo (who has secretly followed him) frees Clopin and the other prisoners. Clopin attacks Frollo, knocking him unconscious, and releases Esméralda and they flee the prison to Notre Dame for sanctuary ("Liberes").

Gringoire sings to the moon ("Lune") in which he describes Quasimodo's pain and suffering because of his love for Esméralda.

Quasimodo leaves Esmeralda asleep in a safe place in Notre Dame ("Je te laisse un sifflet"), but bitterly reflects that while he will love her forever, his ugliness will ensure that she will never love him ("Dieu que le monde est injuste"). Alone, Esmeralda hopes that she will survive for the man she loves and sings about how Love has the power to change the world even should she die ("Vivre").

With Clopin and his people occupying Notre Dame, Frollo orders Phoebus and his men to break sanctuary and attack the cathedral to drive them out ("L’Attaque de Notre Dame"). Clopin and his people resist bravely but are no match for the armed soldiers, and in the first attack Clopin is fatally wounded. Dying, he begs Esmeralda to take his place as leader. The final battle has Esmeralda and her people facing off against Phoebus and his soldiers, but the result is a foregone conclusion – Esmeralda is captured and the outcasts defeated. Phoebus coldbloodedly hands Esmeralda over to be executed, orders the outcasts driven out of Paris ("Déportés") and leaves with Fleur-de-Lys.

Quasimodo, searching Notre Dame for Esmeralda, finds Frollo standing at the top of one of the towers and begs him to help Esmeralda ("Mon maitre, mon sauveur"). Frollo, finally driven insane, shows him the sight of Esmeralda being hanged and to Quasimodo's horror announces that he is responsible. As he laughs wildly, the enraged Quasimodo seizes him and hurls him down the stairs of the tower to his death. As the executioners are cutting down Esmeralda's body from the gibbet, Quasimodo appears and demands that they give him her body ("Donnez-la moi"). Driving them away, he kneels beside her body and mourns her, promising to stay with her and that even in death they will not be parted ("Danse, mon Esmeralda").

After the curtain call, Gringoire leads the cast in a reprise of "Le temps des cathédrales".

Musical numbers

1These titles follow French-language capitalization conventions (sentence case / init caps instead of title case)
2English titles shown here are the title of the song in the English-language version of the production, and not necessarily a direct translation of the original song title.

The show
Director Gilles Maheu staged the show in concert style, with the principal singers standing downstage center, with non-singing dancers upstage. The orchestra and chorus were prerecorded; the principals wore very obvious boom microphones.

Critical response in Great Britain

Critical reception in Great Britain was mixed, with praise for the music and choreography, and general disdain for the English translation of the lyrics and the show's overall direction.  For example, The Times praised the "doleful energy" of Garou's Quasimodo and the "occasional imaginative production touches: huge bells with writhing, upside-down humans for clappers" but concludes "Another Les Mis this isn't." According to the Oxford Encyclopedia of Popular Music, the producer of the London show Michael White fought back this criticism: "This is not a musical but a rock show with a strong storyline. I think it is difficult for dramatic critics who have to understand everything from Shakespeare to Harold Pinter to understand that." Eventually, despite initially poor reviews, Notre-Dame de Paris "became the most successful of the Gallic-themed shows to open in the West End during 2000".

Production history

The original production of Notre-Dame de Paris made musicals fashionable again in France and, since its inception, has spawned a number of other notable productions. As part of the publicity prior to the Paris opening three songs were released as singles: "Vivre", "Le temps des cathédrales", and "Belle". "Belle" became a huge hit, and was named Song of the Year in France, and nominated for Song of the Century.

Since its debut, the show has been professionally played in Belgium, Canada, China, France, Italy, Japan, Lebanon, Luxembourg, Poland, Russia, Singapore, South Korea, Spain, Switzerland, Taiwan, Turkey, United Kingdom, Ukraine and United States, and has been translated into seven languages (English, Spanish, Italian, Russian, Korean, Flemish, and Polish). A shorter version in English was performed in 2000 in Las Vegas, Nevada (United States) and a full-length London production, also in English, ran for seventeen months. Several songs from the show, such as "Vivre", "Belle" and "Le temps des cathédrales", have been released as singles with a huge success in French speaking countries. An English version of "Vivre" (Live for the One I Love) was released by both Celine Dion and Australian chanteuse Tina Arena, and appears on the original London cast recording, even though Dion did not participate in the musical.

In 2010-2014 several concert versions of the musical which reunited the original cast were presented in Kyiv, Moscow, Saint-Petersburg, Paris and Beirut.

In February 2016 it was announced that a revival of the original musical Notre Dame de Paris is scheduled to open in November 2016 in the Palais des Congrès in Paris, followed by a tour in France.

A New York French tour was announced for 2020, but was pushed back to 2022 due to COVID-19.

Notre-Dame de Paris, according to the Guinness Book of Records, had the most successful first year of any musical ever. The score has been recorded at least seven times to date (2007): the original French concept album, which featured Israeli singer Achinoam Nini (aka Noa) as Esmeralda was followed by a live, complete recording of the original Paris cast. A complete recording of the score in Italian was made, along with a single disc of highlights in Spanish from the Barcelona production. The original London cast album featured several of the original Paris stars, but only preserved a fraction of the score in English.
In 2023, Notre Dame De Paris returns to the Original theatre Palais des Congrès on November 15 with the same cast, including Angelo Del Vecchio as Quasimodo, and Daniel Lavoie, who performed with Bruno Pelletier, the original Gringoire, as Frollo.

Casts

Original Paris cast
 Hélène Ségara: Esmeralda
 Garou: Quasimodo
 Daniel Lavoie: Frollo
 Bruno Pelletier: Gringoire
 Patrick Fiori: Phoebus
 Luck Mervil: Clopin
 Julie Zenatti: Fleur-de-Lys

Original Las Vegas cast
 Janien Masse: Esmeralda
 Doug Storm: Quasimodo
 Francis Ruivivar, T. Eric Hart: Frollo
 Deven May: Gringoire
 Mark W Smith: Phoebus
 David Jennings: Clopin
 Jessica Grové: Fleur-de-Lys

Original Canadian French cast
 France D'Amour: Esmeralda
 Mario Pelchat: Quasimodo
 Robert Marien: Frollo
 Sylvain Cossette: Gringoire
 Pierre Bénard-Conway: Phoebus
 Charles Biddle Jr.: Clopin
 Natasha St-Pier: Fleur-de-Lys

Original Canadian English cast 
 Alessandra Ferrari:  Esmeralda
 Matt Laurent: Quasimodo
 Robert Marien: Frollo
 Richard Charest: Gringoire
 Yvan Pedneault: Phoebus
 Ian Carlyle: Clopin
 Myriam Brousseau: Fleur-de-Lys

Original London cast featuring 4 original stars 
 Tina Arena:  Esmeralda
 Garou: Quasimodo
 Daniel Lavoie: Frollo
 Bruno Pelletier: Gringoire
 Steve Balsamo: Phoebus
 Luck Mervil: Clopin
 Natasha St-Pier: Fleur-de-Lys

Theatre Mogador cast
 Shirel: Esmeralda
 Adrian Devil: Quasimodo
 Michel Pascal: Frollo
 Cyril Niccolai: Gringoire
 Richard Charest: Phoebus
 Roddy Julienne: Clopin
 Claire Cappelletti: Fleur-de-Lys

Original Spanish cast
 Thais Ciurana / Lily Dahab: Esmeralda 
 Albert Martínez, Carles Torregrosa: Quasimodo
 Enrique Sequero, Carles Torregrosa: Frollo
 : Gringoire
 Lisardo Guarinos: Phoebus
 Paco Arrojo: Clopin
 : Fleur-de-Lys

Original Italian cast
 Lola Ponce: Esmeralda
 Giò Di Tonno: Quasimodo
 : Frollo
 Matteo Setti: Gringoire
 : Phoebus
 : Clopin
 Claudia d'Ottavi:  Fleur-de-Lys

Original Russian cast
 Teona Dolnikova: Esmeralda
 Vyacheslav Petkun: Quasimodo
 Alexander Marakoulin: Frollo
 Vladimir Dybsky: Gringoire
 Anton Makarsky: Phoebus
 Sergey Li: Clopin
 Anastasia Stotskaya: Fleur-de-Lys

Original Korean cast
 Bada, Oh Jin-yeong, : Esmeralda
 , : Quasimodo
 , : Frollo
 Kim Tae-hoon, Jeon Dong-Suk: Gringoire
 Kim Seong-min, Kim Tae-hyeong: Phoebus
 , : Clopin
 Kim Jeong-hyeon, Gwak Sun-young: Fleur-de-Lys

Original Belgian cast 
 : Esmeralda
 : Quasimodo
 : Frollo
 : Gringoire
 Tim Driesen: Phoebus
 : Clopin
 Jorien Zeevaart: Fleur-de-Lys

Original Polish cast
 Maja Gadzińska, Ewa Kłosowicz: Esmeralda
 , : Quasimodo
 Artur Guza, Piotr Płuska: Frollo
 Jan Traczyk, Maciej Podgórzak: Gringoire
 Przemysław Zubowicz, Maciej Podgórzak, Rafał Szatan: Phoebus
 Krzysztof Wojciechowski, : Clopin
 , Weronika Walenciak: Fleur-de-Lys

Original Ukrainian cast
 Olha Zhmuryn - Esmeralda
 Zinoviy Karach - Quasimodo
 Anton Kopytin - Frollo
 Viktoriia Vasalatii - Fleur-de-Lys
 Viktor Romanchenko - Clopin
 Mykhailo Dimov - Gringoire
 Arkadii Voitiuk - Phoebus

Recordings
Cast Albums
1997: Concept Album
1998: Original Paris Cast, live at the Palais des Congrès
2000: London Studio Album
2001: French Studio Album
2001: Paris Cast (Live At The Théâtre Mogador)
2001: Original Spanish Cast
2001: Original Italian Cast
2002: Italian Cast, Live at the Arena di Verona
2002: Original Russian Cast
2002: French Studio Album with Les Choeurs de France
2005: Korean Tour Cast
2008: Original Korean Cast
2009: Original Highlights Russian Cast
2010: Original Flemish cast
2017: Paris Cast (live)

Instrumental Albums
1999: Orchestral French and English versions by I Fiamminghi
2000: Piano version by Alan Lapointe
2003: Instrumental version of Italian Cast
2008: Instrumental version of Russian Cast

Video Recordings
1999: Live At The Palais des Congrès
2001: Live At The Arena di Verona
2002: Live At The Channel One Russia
2008: Live At The Sejong Center

See also

 Victor Hugo

References

Further reading
 Video

External links
 Official US website
 Notre-Dame de Paris Russian production site

1998 musicals
Musicals based on novels
Sung-through musicals
Works based on The Hunchback of Notre-Dame